Afiyah Matthias (born 20 December 1992) is a Trinidad and Tobago footballer who plays as a midfielder. She has been a member of the Trinidad and Tobago women's national team.

Club career
Matthias has played for Real Dimension in Trinidad and Tobago.

International career
Matthias capped for Trinidad and Tobago at senior level during the 2010 CONCACAF Women's World Cup Qualifying and the 2014 CONCACAF Women's Championship.

References

1992 births
Living people
Trinidad and Tobago women's footballers
Women's association football midfielders
Trinidad and Tobago women's international footballers